Holland Park Mews is a mews street in the Holland Park district of the Royal Borough of Kensington and Chelsea in London, W11. The mews consists of 67 residential properties, originally built as 68 stables, on a cobbled road with two entrances from Holland Park. The west entrance passes under an arch listed Grade II on the National Heritage List for England. The arch was built in 1862, and the stables from 1860 to 1879.

In addition to the arch the houses either side of the mews are Grade II listed in two groups as Nos 1–34 and 35–67. The Historic England listing describes them as "buildings of unusual design and marked picturesqueness".

Bridget Cherry, writing in the 1991 London: North West edition of the Pevsner Architectural Guides, remarks of Holland Park Mews, "The grand entrance gate...and splendid parapets survive to distinguish these as very ritzy mews". The architectural critic Ian Nairn described the mews it as "a cathedral among mewses (sic)".

The actor Ian Holm is a former resident of the mews.

Roger Moore and Alexis Kanner filmed a scene from the 1969 film Crossplot on the mews, and Peter Cushing and Sue Lloyd went to a party held at the mews in the 1968 film Corruption.

References

Grade II listed buildings in the Royal Borough of Kensington and Chelsea
Grade II listed houses in London
Houses completed in 1869
Houses in Holland Park
Mews streets in London
Stables
Streets in the Royal Borough of Kensington and Chelsea